Garbhadhana (literally: attaining the wealth of the womb) is the first of the 16 saṃskāras (sacraments, rites of passage) in Hinduism.

Description
Garbhadhana is a composite word of Garbha (womb) and Ādhāna (process of receiving), and it literally means receiving pregnancy. It is a private rite of the intent of a couple to have a child. It is a ceremony performed before Nisheka (conception and impregnation). In some ancient texts, the word simply refers to the rite of passage where the couple have sex to have a child, and no ceremonies are mentioned.

Literature
Scholars trace Garbhadhana rite to Vedic hymns, such as those in sections 8.35.10 through 8.35.12 of the Rigveda, where repeated prayers for progeny and prosperity are solemnized,

The Vedic texts have many passages, where the hymn solemnizes the desire for having a child, without specifying the gender of the child. For example, the Rigveda in section 10.184 states,

The desire for progeny, without mentioning gender, is in many other books of the Rigveda, such as the hymn 10.85.37. The Atharva Veda, similarly in verse 14.2.2, states a ritual invitation to the wife, by her husband to mount the bed for conception, "being happy in mind, here mount the bed; give birth to children for me, your husband". Later texts, such as the Brihadaranyaka Upanishad, in the last chapter detailing the education of a student, include lessons for his Grihastha stage of life. There, the student is taught, that as a husband, he should cook rice for the wife, and they together eat the food in certain way depending on whether they wish for the birth of a daughter or a son, as follows,

The different Grhyasutras differ in their point of view, whether the garbhadhana is to be performed only once, before the first conception, or every time before the couple plan to have additional children. To answer this question, the medieval era texts of various schools discussed and offered diverse views on whether the ritual is a rite of passage for the baby's anticipation in the womb (garbha), or for the wife (kshetra). A rite of passage of the baby would imply that Garbhadhana sanskara is necessary for each baby and therefore every time the couple intend to have a new baby, while a rite of passage of the wife would imply a one time ritual suffices.

Ceremony
According to the Grhya Sutras, at the beginning of the performance of this saṃskāra, the wife dressed up and the husband recited Vedic verses consisting similes of natural creation and invocations to gods for helping his wife in conception. The rite of passage marked the milestone where both husband and wife agreed to have a child and raise a family together.

See also
Saṃskāra

References

External links
 Garbhadhana Samskara

Samskaras